The 2022 European Open was a men's tennis tournament played on indoor hard courts. It was the seventh edition of the European Open and part of the ATP Tour 250 series of the 2022 ATP Tour. It took place at the Lotto Arena in Antwerp, Belgium, from 17 October until 23 October 2022.

Champions

Singles 

  Félix Auger-Aliassime def.  Sebastian Korda, 6–3, 6–4

Doubles 

  Tallon Griekspoor /  Botic van de Zandschulp def.  Rohan Bopanna /  Matwé Middelkoop, 3–6, 6–3, [10–5]

Singles main-draw entrants

Seeds

 Rankings are as of 10 October 2022

Other entrants
The following players received wildcards into the singles main draw:
  Gilles-Arnaud Bailly
  Michael Geerts
  Stan Wawrinka

The following player was accepted directly into the main draw using a protected ranking:
  Dominic Thiem

The following players received entry from the qualifying draw:
  Jesper de Jong 
  Dominic Stricker 
  Luca Van Assche
  Tim van Rijthoven

The following players received entry as lucky losers:
  Geoffrey Blancaneaux
  Manuel Guinard

Withdrawals
  Alexander Bublik → replaced by  Marc-Andrea Hüsler
  Borna Ćorić → replaced by  David Goffin
  Andy Murray → replaced by  Manuel Guinard
  Arthur Rinderknech → replaced by  Geoffrey Blancaneaux

Doubles main-draw entrants

Seeds

 Rankings are as of 10 October 2022.

Other entrants
The following pairs received wildcards into the doubles main draw:
  Ruben Bemelmans /  Alexander Blockx
  Xavier Malisse /  Diego Schwartzman

The following pair received entry as alternates:
  Ivan Sabanov /  Matej Sabanov

Withdrawals
  Marcos Giron /  Sebastian Korda → replaced by  Ivan Sabanov /  Matej Sabanov
  Marcel Granollers /  Horacio Zeballos → replaced by  Sander Arends /  David Pel

References

External links 
 

2022
European Open
European Open
European Open